The Wyndhamvale Football Club is an Australian rules football club which compete in the WRFL  since 1989. They are based in the Melbourne suburb of Wyndham Vale.

History
In 1985, the club fielded a senior team in the Reserve Division of the Western Suburbs FL. Half way through that season, due to the huge number of player response, a second team was entered in the same competition. The original team played off in the finals that year.
In the 1986 season Wyndhamvale fielded teams A3 and A2 senior teams.

Wyndhamvale fielded a Senior team in Geelong & District Football League in 1987 and 1988. The club transferred to the Footscray District FL in 1989. The Club went into recess from 1995 to 1998 and resumed in season 1999 in the Western Region Football League Division 2 in 1999.

Premierships
 Western Region Football League
 Division Two (1): 2015

Bibliography
 History of the WRFL/FDFL by Kevin Hillier – 
 History of football in Melbourne's north west by John Stoward –

References

External links
Official website

Australian rules football clubs in Melbourne
Australian rules football clubs established in 1979
1979 establishments in Australia
Western Region Football League clubs
Sport in the City of Wyndham